Tajura, also spelt Tajoura, is a town in north-western Libya, and baladiyah in the Tripoli Muhafazah, on the Mediterranean coast  east of Tripoli.

From 2001 to 2007 Tajura was the capital of the Tajura wa Arba' District. Tajura is also known to be the most anti-Gaddafi district in Tripoli and had high casualties in the Libyan revolution.

History
The Ottoman Turks established a base at Tajura in 1531.  Under the command of Hayreddin Barbarossa, the site was selected for its proximity to Tripoli which had come under the Knights of Malta in 1530 when Charles V of Spain, as King of Sicily, had given them Tripoli, Gozo and Malta. Tripoli was captured in the Siege of Tripoli.

Tajura was the center of Libya's nuclear research, with a 10 megawatt reactor, built by the Soviet Union, which came online in 1981.

During the second Libyan Civil War, Tajura has become associated with the insurgency of 101 Battalion.

The name Tajoura is rumoured to be named after a princess who lost her crown. "Taj" meaning crown, and "oura" being the name of the princess, the crown was found in this area and so was named Tajoura (Oura's crown).

Districts of Tajura 

 Goot Al-Rumman 
 Abe Al Ash'her
 Al-Marouhna
 Al Hamidiya
 Al Kwateb
 Al'aswal
 Awlad Al Turki
 Be'ar Al Sanyaa
 Shatt al-Sidi Othman (Sidi Othman)
 Btisp
 Be'ar Al Osta Milad
 El Atamana
 Dakhla
 Rima
 Diyar Jaber
 Almchai - Aribat - and the cemetery Sahaabi and Hada title Almchai
 Market - the middle
 Goudec
 Punishment (the headquarters of the commander Uqba)
 Al Knadra
 Andilsi
 Shatt span
 al mashin
 Wadi Al Rabie

Tourism in Tajura 
 Tajura tourist village Sidi al-Andalus. Used occasionally as a meeting place by Muammar al-Gaddafi. Mainly used as guest house by Teknica (UK) Ltd, and for a short time by Taknia Libya. Demolished in December 2010.
 Village Heroj
 Fish Market
 "Best Fish Restaurants and Takeways in Libya"
 Tajoura city centre (Al- Muzdawaja)
 The palm tree next to the mosque

Tajura Sports Centre 
 Club editorial
 Club Abe Al Ash'her
 Club Hamidiya

References 

Populated coastal places in Libya
Oases of Libya
Populated places in Tripoli District, Libya
Baladiyat of Libya